Hirsch Drisin (20 September 1902 – 14 October 1972) was a Finnish sprinter. He competed in the men's 4 × 400 metres relay at the 1924 Summer Olympics. Drisin was Jewish, and he represented the Finnish Jewish sports club Makkabi Helsinki.

References

External links
 

1902 births
1972 deaths
Athletes (track and field) at the 1924 Summer Olympics
Finnish male sprinters
Olympic athletes of Finland
Place of birth missing
Finnish Jews
20th-century Finnish people